Since 2016 Sean Schimmel has been a swim coach at the University of Georgia working with the men's and women's college teams and primarily coaches the pro group training at Georgia. Schimmel is the former head coach of the Arkansas Razorbacks Swimming and Diving program at the University of Arkansas. He is the seventh head coach in program history and joined Arkansas in July 2012. Previously he was the Head Coach of the Men's and Women's Swimming and Diving Teams at the University of Maryland for 4 years, The Associate Head Coach for the Men's and Women's Teams at LSU for 2 years and the Assistant Men's coach at Harvard for 7 years. Schimmel graduated from the University of Southern California in 1992.

References 

College swimming coaches in the United States
Arkansas Razorbacks swimming coaches
Maryland Terrapins swimming coaches
LSU Tigers and Lady Tigers swimming coaches
Harvard Crimson swimming coaches